James Kenneth Johnson (May 30, 1916 – August 22, 1997) was a colonel in the United States Air Force. In the Korean War he was a double ace, credited with shooting down ten enemy aircraft. He also had one "kill" in World War II, when he was a lieutenant colonel. He received numerous awards, including the Distinguished Service Cross, the Silver Star, the Legion of Merit, and the Distinguished Flying Cross.

Early life and education
Johnson was born on May 30, 1916, in Phoenix, Arizona. In 1939, he graduated from the University of Arizona. On December 28 of that year, he entered the Army Air Corps' Aviation Cadet Program, training at Kelly and Randolph Fields. He was commissioned on August 30, 1940, when he also received his wings.

Military career
From 1940 until October 1943, he was the Squadron Commander of the 43d Pursuit Squadron serving at Albrook Field in the Panama Canal Zone, where he helped protect the Panama Canal with his P-40 Warhawk. Also, he was Deputy Commander of the 404th Fighter-Bomber Group from November 1943 to October 1944. In March 1944, he went with the 404th to southern England to prepare for the Normandy landings, flying a P-47 Thunderbolt. From October 1944 until after the end of the war, in June 1945, he commanded the 48th Fighter-Bomber Group in Belgium. He flew 92 missions in the Thunderbolt, during which he was credited with one kill: a Fw 190.

After World War II, Johnson served at Ellington Field in Texas, where he was Base Commander, Instructor Pilot, project officer, and Commander of the 3605th Navigation Training Group. From September 1951 to October 1952, he was also Commander of the 3595th Flying Training Group at Nellis Air Force Base in Nevada.

During the Korean War, Johnson commanded the 4th Fighter Interceptor Wing from November 1952 to August 1953, flying combat in an F-86 Sabre; it was from that plane that he received his nickname, "The Mayor of Sabre Jet City". On March 28, 1953, he became the war's 29th jet ace when he shot down his fifth MiG-15. After 86 missions and eight months of combat, he had destroyed ten enemy aircraft, damaged nine more, and had three probables, making him the first double jet ace wing commander.

From when the war ended in 1953 until September 1956, Johnson worked at the Air Force headquarters in the Pentagon, where he was chief of the Air Defence Group in Research and Development. He then commanded the 55th Strategic Reconnaissance Wing at Forbes Air Force Base in Kansas from September 1956 to August 1959. After that, he went to Carswell Air Force Base, where he commanded two groups: the 3958th Operational Test and Evaluation Group from August 1959 to March 1960; and the 43rd Bomb Wing from then until June 1961. He was then posted to the 19th Air Division, with whom he was Director of Operations, from June to September 1961. The 43rd, the first supersonic bomb wing helped test the new, supersonic B-58 Hustler, developed by the Air Research and Development Command, Strategic Air Command, and Convair. With the B-58, the 43rd Wing broke eleven records for aircraft performance. In September 1961, he served at Headquarters Tactical Air Command at Langley Air Force Base, Virginia. He retired from the Air Force on November 30, 1963.

Later life and death
James Johnson had four daughters (Jaye, Margaret, Patricia and Judith) with his first wife Mary Ellen and two children (Sherri and James Jr.) with his second wife Lorraine. He has several grandchildren including Jennifer Rachel Hecker, and great-grandchildren including Forest Shannon Hecker and Reed Bennett Hecker. In 1979, Johnson was remarried to his wife Sylvia, with Arizona Senator Barry Goldwater as his best man.

He died on August 22, 1997, and was buried at Arlington National Cemetery.

Awards and legacy
On November 12, 1953, Johnson was awarded the Distinguished Service Cross and the Silver Star for actions on June 30 and May 17, 1953, respectively. He also received two awards of the Legion of Merit and three of the Distinguished Flying Cross.

While he commanded the 43rd Bomb Wing, he became the first and only wing commander to win the Blériot, MacKay, Thompson, and Harmon trophies.

The Johnson Dining Facility at Kadena Air Base is named for Johnson.

See also
List of Korean War flying aces

References

Further reading

1916 births
1997 deaths
American Korean War flying aces
United States Air Force officers
United States Army Air Forces pilots of World War II
Recipients of the Distinguished Service Cross (United States)
Recipients of the Silver Star
Recipients of the Distinguished Flying Cross (United States)
Recipients of the Legion of Merit
Recipients of the Air Medal
Recipients of the Croix de Guerre (France)
University of Arizona alumni
Mackay Trophy winners
United States Air Force personnel of the Korean War
Burials at Arlington National Cemetery